Crozonaspis  is a trilobite in the order Phacopida, that existed during the middle Ordovician in what is now France. It was described by Henry in 1968, and the type species is Crozonaspis struvei. It was described from Brittany.

References

 Crozonaspis at the Paleobiology Database

Dalmanitidae
Ordovician trilobites of Europe
Fossils of France